Roland Ndyomugyenyi Bish is a Ugandan legislator.

Roland Ndyomugyenyi Bish was in 2021 elected as a member of Uganda's eleventh Parliament, representing Rukiga County in Rukiga District, Western Uganda.

Biography 

Roland Ndyomugyenyi Bish was born on 5 August 1977 in Nyabirengye, Bukinda in Rukiga.

He went to Nyabireema Primary school before joining Bukinda Secondary School and Rwamanyonyi SSS for his Ordinary level education.

Ronald attended St. Paul's SS Bukinda for his high school. He later joined the National Teacher's College in Kabale District from 1998 to 2000 where he attained a diploma.

Bish later joined Makerere University in Kampala for Development Studies course and graduated in 2004.

He later joined Herriot Wat University in the United Kingdom, where he attained a master's degree in Business Administration.

Roland has previously worked with Barclays Bank and Uganda Road Fund.

Political career 
In 2021, he was elected as the Member of Parliament representing Rukiga County in Western Uganda.

Personal life 
He is married.

References 

Ugandan politicians
Rukiga District
1977 births
Living people